Namataea is a monotypic genus of flowering plants belonging to the family Sapindaceae. The only species is Namataea simplicifolia.

Its native range is Nigeria to Cameroon.

References

Sapindaceae
Monotypic Sapindaceae genera